Alberta provincial electoral districts are currently single member ridings that each elect one member to the Legislative Assembly of Alberta. There are 87 districts fixed in law in Alberta.

History
The original twenty five districts were drawn up by Liberal Member of Parliament Frank Oliver prior to the first general election of 1905. The original boundaries were widely regarded as being gerrymandered to favour the Alberta Liberal Party, although the Liberal Party did receive the majority of votes in the 1905 election and thus rightly formed majority government. Every boundary redistribution since 1905 has been based on the original boundaries, with districts being split or merged.

Starting in 1909, districts were grouped to make multiple-member districts. Most members continued to be elected in single-member districts but every election from 1909 to 1955 saw members elected in a multi-member contest.

From 1905 to 1924 with only a few exceptions each district elected a single member on the First Past the Post system. Calgary and Edmonton as well as Medicine Hat were elected on a plurality block vote, where 2 or 5 members were elected in a city-wide district and each voter could cast as many votes as seats to be filled.

There were also two cases where members were elected outside of the geographical districts and did not represent any districts. Such was the case in the world wars when Albertans serving overseas voted for their own representatives.

From 1924 to 1956 Calgary and Edmonton MLAs were elected in multiple-member districts encompassing whole cities using Single transferable vote to elect five to seven members. In 1926, Medicine Hat was a two-member district. Outside these cities single-member districts elected single MLAs using the Alternative Voting system, with vote transfers taking place only if no candidate had a majority of the vote in the first count. By-elections in the two big cities during this period were conducted using Alternative Voting. Under STV, some results were known as soon as the first vote count was done, but some seats took a couple days of vote transfers to fill. But the mixed representation elected in each city under STV, reflective of the mixed sentiment of the city's voters, was thought worth the wait.

There were no district changes between 1926 and 1940. But Edmonton and Calgary were given one more member then reverted down to five members again in 1940.

With Alberta in a population boom in the 1950s and Calgary and Edmonton growing, single transferable vote may have been seen as too complicated, with vote counting taking days before final results could be announced. But the Social Credit government's rationale for the change away from STV and IRV was that a large number of votes were being declared spoiled. No other major social unit favored the move but the government made the change anyway. The government felt threatened by the growing number of opposition MLAs being elected (although it was still taking more than 60 percent of the seats in the Legislature). In 1959 the government returned Alberta to First past the post elections in single-member districts, last used across the province in 1905. No government has since changed the electoral system (although since then the number of members has increased from 61 to 87).

In 1977 Elections Alberta was established as an independent, non-partisan office of the Legislative Assembly responsible for administering provincial elections, by-elections and referendums.

1990s

The early 1990s proved to be a contentious period for delineation of electoral districts in Alberta. The Supreme Court of British Columbia ruling in Dixon v. Attorney General of British Columbia in 1989 invalidated the provincial electoral district re-distribution due to wide variations between electoral district populations for British Columbia, finding these differences inconsistent with the Charter of Rights and Freedoms. Cognizant of this the Alberta Legislature tasked a Special Committee chaired by Taber-Warner MLA Bob Bogle to evaluate the re-distribution of electoral districts in the province. The Report of the Select Special Committee on Electoral Boundaries was submitted to the Legislature in November 1990 and was referred to the Court of Appeal of Alberta. While the Court of Appeals reference found the boundaries consistent with the Charter, the report was scrapped and amendments to the Electoral Divisions Act were introduced in early 1991 to effectively "Charter-proof" the new districts.

The same Select Committee was tasked with creating the new report which was presented to the Legislature in November 1992, and once again referred to the Court of Appeal of Alberta to rule on the constitutional validity of the boundaries. The four Progressive Conservative MLAs on the Select Committee (Bob Bogle, Stockwell Day, Pat Nelson, Mike Cardinal) participated fully in developing the report, while the Opposition refused to appoint any MLAs. Subsequently, the boundaries were implemented and used for the June 1993 Alberta general election. The Court of Appeal of Alberta withheld Charter condemnation, but found numerous issues with the process and requirements put forward for the re-distribution. In particular the members of the Select Committee were unable to provide sufficient rationale to the court for a number of the boundaries and district sizes recommended in the report. The court explicitly voiced the opinion that a proper electoral boundary review was necessary within the term of the present government (which expired in 1997).

Following the issues in the early 1990s, a semi-independent boundary commissions were set up to tweak the boundaries to population changes that occurred after every census. Committees are composed of a neutral Judge, two members appointed by the governing party, and two members appointed by the official opposition.

2010 electoral boundary commission

The 2009/2010 Alberta Electoral Boundaries Commission was established on 31 July 2009, and was chaired by Justice J. M. Walter and members included Keith Archer, Peter Dobbie, Brian Evans and Allyson Jeffs. The Final Report by the commission with recommendations was submitted to the legislature on 24 June 2010. The recommendations of the Commission were accepted and the electoral division boundaries were implemented by Bill 28, Electoral Divisions Act.

The 2010 redistribution increased the number of seats in the Alberta Legislative Assembly from 83 to 87, a decision by Premier Ed Stelmach to ensure rural districts would not be removed in the increasingly urban Alberta. The Commission's final report warned that Alberta would have to reevaluate how seats are distributed to rural areas specifically in regards to the province's large northern areas. The report warned that the population discrepancy required to preserve lesser populated rural electoral districts in the face of growing urban districts remained controversial for Albertans and elected representatives.

A minority position in the Commission found the division of Alberta into three geographic areas (Calgary, Edmonton, other) problematic as it effectively ignored fast growing mid-sized cities which were fragmented into hybrid rural-urban constituencies.

2017 electoral boundary commission
Under the Electoral Boundaries Commission Act requires that a Commission be appointed during the first session of the Legislature following every second general election. The Commission requires a non-partisan chair, two government members recommended by the Premier, and two opposition members. Due to the decision by Premier Jim Prentice to call an early election in 2015, the Commission was required to be formed before the prescribed date in time for the next election in 2019. Previous Commissions had provided for modest redistributions in favour of Alberta's cities which according to Political Scientist Roger Epp brought forward "deep rural anxieties" regarding declining population and influence in Alberta.

The Commission was provided with a mandate which kept the size of the Legislature fixed at 87 seats. The Commission was appointed, led by Justice Myra Bielby made only incremental changes adding one new seat in Calgary and Edmonton, as well as a seat in the Airdrie area. The Commission did however make significant statements on the rural-urban divide in Alberta, noting "Alberta is no longer entirely or primarily rural in nature" and a "disproportionate preservation of the rural voice" was no longer acceptable or feasible under law. While the Electoral Boundaries Commission Act permits up to four districts to be formed with a population 50 per cent lower than the average population, the Commission only recommended that two of these districts be formed. The districts include Central Peace-Notley which had a population of 28,993 and area of 47,311 km², and Lesser Slave Lake which had a population of 27,818, compared to the average population of electoral districts of 46,803 following redistribution.

A minority opinion was presented by Commission members appointed by the opposition, arguing that Alberta's rate of growth was a threat to "a critical part of our history, culture, and primary economic voice" which is at risk of being lost through continued redistribution.

Number of districts

As is the case with nearly every other Canadian jurisdiction, the number of districts has not increased in proportion to the growth in the provincial population. In 1905, 25,000 votes were cast across the province to elect 25 MLAs. In 1982, 945,000 votes, almost 40 times the 1905 total, were cast across the province to choose 79 MLAs, less than four times the 1905 seat total. Prior to the 1986 election the number of districts was fixed by law at 83 thus any change to that number would have to be enacted by the legislature.  Even though the population has increased by more than 40 percent between 1986 and 2009, the number of members did not change. Finally due to changes wrought in 2010, the 2012 election saw the number of members increase to 87, where it has stayed despite a 15 percent increase in the provincial population since 2009.

Naming conventions
Like the federal districts in Alberta, urban ridings traditionally begin with the city name. This has generally applied where an urban area is divided and joined with rural areas, such as Grande Prairie-Wapiti and Fort McMurray-Lac La Biche. Notable exceptions are Cypress-Medicine Hat and Brooks-Medicine Hat, which follow the convention in other rural areas of listing communities in alphabetical order (another exception being Vermilion-Lloydminster-Wainwright).

Unlike federal practice, Alberta uses hyphens to join all name elements. This is true for electoral districts named for multiple communities as well as urban districts (where the city name is followed by a direction, a neighbourhood, a landmark, or the name of a historical politician). For example, compare the provincial Fort McMurray-Conklin with the federal Fort McMurray—Cold Lake, where the em dash is used instead of the hyphen to join names of separate communities. Also compare the provincial Edmonton-Strathcona with the federal Edmonton Strathcona, where a space indicates that Strathcona is a neighbourhood of Edmonton.

Current districts named for individuals include several premiers: 
 Calgary-Klein for Ralph Klein, 
 Calgary-Lougheed for Peter Lougheed, 
 Edmonton-Manning for Ernest Manning, and 
 Edmonton-Rutherford for Alexander Rutherford. 
Three are named for former party leaders: 
 Calgary-Shaw for former Liberal leader Joseph Tweed Shaw, 
 Central Peace-Notley for former NDP leader Grant Notley, and 
 Edmonton-Decore for former Liberal leader and Edmonton mayor Laurence Decore. 
In addition, Edmonton-McClung is named for suffragette and MLA Nellie McClung. The abolished riding of Edmonton-Roper was named for CCF leader Elmer Roper.

List of provincial electoral districts

Current districts

Districts prior to 2019 election

* District has been abolished and re-established.

Historical provincial electoral districts

Acadia
Acadia-Coronation
Airdrie
Airdrie-Chestermere
Airdrie-Rocky View
Alexandra
Athabasca
Athabasca-Lac La Biche
Athabasca-Redwater
Athabasca-Sturgeon-Redwater
Athabasca-Wabasca
Banff
Banff-Cochrane
Barrhead
Barrhead-Morinville-Westlock
Barrhead-Westlock
Battle River-Wainwright
Beaver River
Bonnyville
Bonnyville-Cold Lake
Bow Valley
Bow Valley-Empress
Bruce
Calgary
Calgary Bowness
Calgary Centre
Calgary-Egmont
Calgary-Forest Lawn
Calgary-Fort
Calgary-Hawkwood
Calgary-Mackay
Calgary-Mackay-Nose Hill
Calgary-McKnight
Calgary-Millican
Calgary-Montrose
Calgary-North Hill
Calgary Nose Creek
Calgary-Nose Hill
Calgary Queens Park
Calgary South
Calgary Victoria Park
Cardston
Cardston-Chief Mountain
Cardston-Taber-Warner

Centre Calgary
Chestermere-Rocky View
Chinook
Claresholm
Clearwater
Clover Bar
Clover Bar-Fort Saskatchewan
Cochrane
Cypress
Cypress-Redcliff
Didsbury
Drayton Valley
Drayton Valley-Calmar
Drumheller
Drumheller-Chinook
Drumheller-Gleichen
Dunvegan
Dunvegan-Central Peace
Dunvegan-Central Peace-Notley
Edmonton
Edmonton-Avonmore
Edmonton-Belmont
Edmonton-Beverly
Edmonton-Beverly-Belmont
Edmonton-Calder
Edmonton-Centre
Edmonton East
Edmonton-Glengarry
Edmonton-Highlands
Edmonton-Highlands-Beverly
Edmonton-Kingsway
Edmonton-Mayfield
Edmonton-Meadowlark
Edmonton-Mill Creek
Edmonton North
Edmonton North East
Edmonton-Norwood
Edmonton-Ottewell
Edmonton-Parkallen
Edmonton-Roper
Edmonton-Sherwood Park
Edmonton West
Edson
Empress
Foothills-Rocky View

Fort McMurray
Fort McMurray-Conklin
Gleichen
Grande Prairie-Smoky
Grouard
Hand Hills
Hand Hills-Acadia
Hanna-Oyen
High River
Innisfail
Jasper West
Lac La Biche
Lac La Biche-McMurray
Lac La Biche-St. Paul
Lac La Biche-St. Paul-Two Hills
Lac Ste. Anne
Lacombe
Lacombe-Stettler
Leduc
Leduc-Beaumont-Devon
Lethbridge
Lethbridge City
Lethbridge District
Little Bow
Lloydminster
Macleod
Medicine Hat
Medicine Hat-Redcliff
Nanton
Nanton-Claresholm
North Calgary
Okotoks
Okotoks-High River
Olds
Olds-Didsbury
Pakan
Pembina
Pincher Creek
Pincher Creek-Crowsnest
Pincher Creek-Macleod
Ponoka
Ponoka-Rimbey
Redcliff
Redwater

Redwater-Andrew
Red Deer
Ribstone
Rocky Mountain
Rocky Mountain House
Rosebud
Sedgewick
Sedgewick-Coronation
Smoky River
South Calgary
Spirit River
Spirit River-Fairview
Spruce Grove-St. Albert
Spruce Grove-Sturgeon-St. Albert
St. Paul
Stettler
Stony Plain
Strathcona
Strathcona Centre
Strathcona East
Strathcona South
Strathcona West
Strathmore-Brooks
Sturgeon
Taber
Three Hills
Three Hills-Airdrie
Vegreville
Vegreville-Bruce
Vegreville-Viking
Vermilion
Vermilion-Lloydminster
Vermilion-Viking
Victoria
Wainwright
Warner
Westlock-Sturgeon
Wetaskiwin-Camrose
Wetaskiwin-Leduc
Whitecourt
Whitecourt-Ste. Anne
Whitford
Willingdon
Willingdon-Two Hills

References

Bibliography

Election related reports

External links
Legislative Assembly of Alberta

 
Alberta, provincial
Electoral districts, provincial